The  New York Giants season was the franchise's 49th season in the National Football League (NFL). The season saw the Giants attempting to improve on their 8–6 record from 1972. However, the Giants suffered one of the worst seasons in franchise history, winning only two games, while losing eleven, and tying one.

The two wins were against the Houston Oilers and the St. Louis Cardinals while the tie was against archrival Philadelphia in week two. That was the last Giants game at Yankee Stadium, which underwent a multi-year renovation, requiring a temporary move to the Yale Bowl in Connecticut. Palmer Stadium at Princeton University in New Jersey had also been considered.

The Giants' two wins in 1973 equaled the second fewest the team had ever posted and it was their worst record since 1966 (1–12–1). Traded after the 1971 season, former quarterback Fran Tarkenton led the Minnesota Vikings (12–2) to the
NFC title; they defeated the Giants 31–7 in the Yale Bowl in the regular season finale.

Fifth-year head coach Alex Webster, a longtime Giant running back, was fired after the season, replaced in mid-January by Bill Arnsparger, the defensive coordinator of the two-time Super Bowl champion Miami Dolphins.

The Giants were at the Yale Bowl again in 1974, moved to Shea Stadium in 1975 (co-tenant with the Jets, Mets, and Yankees), and to Giants Stadium in New Jersey in 1976.

Offseason

NFL Draft

Roster

Regular season 
With Yankee Stadium undergoing refurbishment after the 1973 baseball season, the Giants played their final game there on September 23, against the Philadelphia Eagles, a  The Giants played their final five home games that season at the Yale Bowl in New Haven, Connecticut. On November 18, they defeated the St. Louis Cardinals  their only victory ever recorded at Yale Bowl. They were winless in seven home games there in 1974, and moved to Shea Stadium for one season in 1975.

Schedule 

Note: Intra-division opponents are in bold text.

Standings

See also 
 List of New York Giants seasons

References

External links 
 New York Giants on Pro Football Reference
 Giants on jt-sw.com

New York Giants seasons
New York Giants
New York Giants season
New York Giants season
1970s in the Bronx
History of New Haven, Connecticut
Sports in New Haven, Connecticut